The Matrícula de Tributos (English: Tribute roll) is a 16th-century central Mexican manuscript on amatl paper, listing the tributes paid by the various tributaries of the Aztec Empire.

Each page of the 16-page manuscript represents the tribute of one province, read from the bottom left up. The province's major city is listed first; then farther up the page are tributes from cities under the rule of the major city. Each glyph shows the town's or city's tribute item, and indicates how many of the items were contributed in Nahuatl. Hernán Cortés had people make copies of the tribute roll to learn more about the Aztec economy. With its hundreds of tribute glyphs, the Matrícula is considered an important document in the study of Nahuatl and Aztec culture, mathematics, governance, economy and geography. It is held in the collection of the Instituto Nacional de Antropología e Historia.

The Matrícula was the source for the tribute section of the Codex Mendoza.

References

Mesoamerican codices